Melania Decuseară (born 22 November 1945) is a Romanian diver. She competed in two events at the 1972 Summer Olympics.

References

1945 births
Living people
Romanian female divers
Olympic divers of Romania
Divers at the 1972 Summer Olympics
Sportspeople from Bucharest